Cheillé is a commune in the Indre-et-Loire department in central France.

Population

References

Communes of Indre-et-Loire